Luciano Federico Lautaro Sánchez (born 15 September 1994) is an Argentine professional footballer who plays as a centre-back for Deportivo Camioneros.

Career
Sánchez's career began in Primera D Metropolitana with El Porvenir. Two goals in thirty-seven fixtures followed across the 2015 and 2016 campaigns. For the following season, Sánchez completed a move to fellow fifth tier outfit General Lamadrid. After making twenty-five appearances and netting twice for Villa Devoto club, Sánchez went up to Primera C Metropolitana with Sportivo Italiano in 2017 to play thirty-six times. A year later, Sánchez joined Primera B Nacional side Guillermo Brown. He made his debut against Tigre in the Copa Argentina in July 2018, which preceded his professional league bow on 30 September versus Olimpo.

Career statistics
.

Honours
El Porvenir
Primera D Metropolitana: 2016

References

External links

1994 births
Living people
Place of birth missing (living people)
Argentine footballers
Association football defenders
Primera D Metropolitana players
Primera C Metropolitana players
Primera Nacional players
El Porvenir footballers
General Lamadrid footballers
Sportivo Italiano footballers
Guillermo Brown footballers